James Hall Bell (January 21, 1825 – March 13, 1892) was a justice of the Supreme Court of Texas from October 1858 to August 1864).

References

Justices of the Texas Supreme Court
1825 births
1892 deaths
19th-century American judges